Tekels Park, Camberley, Surrey consists of about  of land, grassland and houses.

History
The estate of Frimley Manor was sold by Henry Tichborne to James Lawrell the elder for £20,000 in 1789. In 1806 the estate was divided. John Tekells built a house on the site now known as Tekels Castle.

In 1860 Captain Knight and Major Spring bought Frimley Park. They divided the remnant of the estate between themselves and each built a house. Captain Knight built a new house on virtually the same site as Tekell's previous house. The land on which Captain Knight built Tekels Castle was sold off gradually to meet the demands of new properties to support the new Army Staff College.

He continued the process of division and when the estate was sold in 1902, to Mr. A. Wilson-Hughes, it was a fraction of its former size. In 1906 the main house burnt down, but the ancillary buildings such as the coach houses and coachman's house and stables survived. In the aftermath of the fire the property remained vacant until 1929 when the members of the Theosophical Society purchased the  estate on behalf of the Society.

Notes

References

External links

Parks and open spaces in Surrey